Maple Grove Township is the name of some places in the U.S. state of Michigan:

 Maple Grove Township, Barry County, Michigan
 Maple Grove Township, Cheboygan County, Michigan (defunct township)
 Maple Grove Township, Manistee County, Michigan
 Maple Grove Township, Saginaw County, Michigan

See also 
 Maple Grove, Benzie County, Michigan, a census-designated place in Benzie County

Michigan township disambiguation pages